Waiter.com, also formerly known as World Wide Waiter, is an online restaurant delivery service that went online in early December 1995.  It was founded by two Stanford University Business School graduates Craig Cohen and Michael Adelberg. Although Waiter.com does service residential areas and takeout orders, its main focus is delivering for corporate business mealtime orders and catered meals. Waiter.com primarily operates in California in the Bay Area.

History 
Waiter.com is considered the first online restaurant delivery service on the web; it pioneered the concept of online restaurant ordering in 1995 when it offered meal options from 60 Silicon Valley partner restaurants, expanding to over 1,300 restaurants in 2017.

The first office was located in Los Altos but is now situated in Sunnyvale, California.

Waiter.com serves multiple locations throughout the United States, including major cities like San Francisco, Dallas, Raleigh/Durham, Seattle, Austin, and Los Angeles. In January 2020, Waiter.com expanded its service to Portland, Oregon through its acquisition of local delivery company Portland Pedal Power.

References 

1995 establishments in California
American companies established in 1995
Companies based in Sunnyvale, California
Internet properties established in 1995
Online food ordering
Online food retailers of the United States
Privately held companies of the United States
Shopping delivery services
Retail companies established in 1995
Transport companies established in 1995